Amoghavarsha (800–878 CE) was an emperor of the Rashtrakutas in India.

Amoghavarsha is also the name of:
 Amoghavarsha II (reigned 929–930)
 Amoghavarsha III (reigned 934–939)
 Khottiga Amoghavarsha (reigned 967–972 CE)
 Amoghavarsha JS, Indian wildlife photographer

See also 
 Amoghavajra  (705–774), translator and Buddhist monk who was prominent in China
 Almogavars, a type of soldier during the Reconquista